RoseLee Vincent is an American politician elected to the Massachusetts House of Representatives. She is a Democrat from Revere, Massachusetts who was sworn in April 16, 2014 to represent the 16th Suffolk district. She won the March 4 primary and the April 1 special election called after the resignation of Kathi-Anne Reinstein.

See also
 2019–2020 Massachusetts legislature

References

Massachusetts Democrats
Living people
People from Revere, Massachusetts
Year of birth missing (living people)
Place of birth missing (living people)
21st-century American politicians
21st-century American women politicians
Women state legislators in Massachusetts